David Roach may refer to:

David Roach (American football) (born 1985), American football safety
David Roach (saxophonist) (born 1955), British classical saxophonist
David Roach (comics), British comics artist
David Roach (athletic director) (born 1949), director of athletics for Fordham University
David Roach of the 1996 film The Adventures of Pinocchio
 David Roach, alias for Keith Silverstein voice actor
 David James Roach, a Canadian and culprit of a bank robbery in Singapore.